Curtatone is a comune (municipality) in the Province of Mantua in the Italian region Lombardy, located about  southeast of Milan and about  southwest of Mantua.

The municipality of Curtatone is formed by the frazioni (subdivisions, mainly villages and hamlets) Buscoldo, Eremo, Grazie, Levata, Montanara (municipal seat), Ponteventuno, San Lorenzo, and San Silvestro.

Curtatone borders the following municipalities: Borgo Virgilio, Castellucchio, Mantua, Marcaria, Porto Mantovano, Rodigo.

Curtatone received the honorary title of city with a presidential decree on July 2, 2002.

References

External links
 Official website

Cities and towns in Lombardy